Mackenzie Scott may refer to:

 MacKenzie Scott (born 1970), American novelist and philanthropist
 Torres (musician) (born 1991), American singer-songwriter